Nephi Sewell (born December 19, 1998) is an American football linebacker for the New Orleans Saints of the National Football League (NFL).

Early life
Sewell was born on December 19, 1998, in American Samoa. He moved to the United States in 2012, and attended Desert Hills High School in Utah. After recording 48 tackles and five interceptions as a sophomore, Sewell missed his entire junior season after suffering a broken neck in his first game of that year. Although he was told he may never play football again, Sewell was determined to play, and ended up recovering in time for his senior season, where he played running back and ran for over 1,250 yards and scored 16 touchdowns, while helping his team win the state championship.

College career
Sewell committed to play college football at the University of Nevada in 2017. He saw immediate playing time as a true freshman, being named the school's player of the week in his debut, where he recorded five tackles at safety. He finished his first season at the school with 12 games played, eight as a starter, and 58 tackles, as well as an interception and a fumble forced and recovered.

As a sophomore in 2018, Sewell started 11 games and finished the year with 53 tackles, one interception and one fumble recovered. His announced his intention to transfer after the season, and although originally committing to BYU, he ended up transferring to Utah. In his first season with the school, he appeared in three games and made 14 tackles. Sewell changed his position from safety to linebacker for the 2020 season, and placed second on the team with 40 tackles, while starting all five of their games.

In 2021, Sewell appeared in 13 games, all but one of which he was a starter in at linebacker. He made a total of 89 tackles, placing second on the team, and additionally recorded one forced fumble and an interception. He had three games with more than 10 tackles and ranked eighth in the conference for average tackles-per-game with 6.8, being named first-team all-conference by Associated Press (AP). Sewell declared for the NFL Draft following the 2021 season. He finished his collegiate career with 44 career games played and 37 starts.

Professional career
After going unselected in the 2022 NFL Draft, Sewell was signed by the New Orleans Saints as an undrafted free agent. He was waived at the final roster cuts on August 30, and was subsequently re-signed to the practice squad. He was promoted to the active roster on November 10, and made his NFL debut in the Saints' 20–10 loss to the Pittsburgh Steelers in week ten. He was waived on December 17 and re-signed to the practice squad. He signed a reserve/future contract on January 9, 2023.

Personal life
Sewell has three brothers who play football: Gabriel, who plays for the Philadelphia Stars of the United States Football League (USFL); Noah, who plays collegiately for Oregon; and Penei, who plays in the NFL with the Detroit Lions. Additionally, his uncles Richard Brown and Isaac Sopoaga both played in the NFL.

References

1998 births
Living people
American football safeties
American football linebackers
Players of American football from American Samoa
Nevada Wolf Pack football players
Utah Utes football players
New Orleans Saints players